Orocrambus angustipennis is a species of moth in the Crambinae family. It is endemic to New Zealand.   O. angustipennis is present in the North Island, South Island and the Chatham Islands.

The wingspan is 34–40 mm for males and 44–50 mm for females. Adults are on wing from November to March in two generations per year.

The larvae feed on Cortaderia, including Cortaderia selloana and Cortaderia toetoe. They feed within growing stems and blades.

References

Moths described in 1877
Crambinae
Moths of New Zealand
Endemic fauna of New Zealand
Endemic moths of New Zealand